Shaun Le Roux (born September 27, 1986 in Cape Town) is a professional squash player who represents South Africa. He reached a career-high world ranking of 37 in the world in March 2015. He appeared as a contestant on BBC gameshow  Pointless in May 2017.

References

External links 
 
 

South African male squash players
Living people
1986 births
Sportspeople from Cape Town
21st-century South African people